Nguyễn Thị Kim (10 December 1917 – 1 December 2011 ) was a Vietnamese sculptor. Her best known work is her statue of Ho Chi Minh, and she was awarded the Ho Chi Minh Prize for fine art in 2000.

References

20th-century Vietnamese sculptors
1917 births
2011 deaths